Yu Shi is a Chinese spirit or god of rain, also known as or conflated with Red Pine (Chisong, 赤松, or Chisongzi – Master Red Pine), among other names. Translations of Yu Shi into English include "Lord of Rain" and "Leader of Rain".

As Yu Shi
Yu Shi in Chinese folk religion and Chinese mythology generally appears in association with Feng Bo, the god of the wind; and Lei Gong, the god of thunder. There are both current religious activities and historical mythical stories associated with Yu Shi. Various references in poetry and popular culture also exist, for example in the Chu ci poems "Tian Wen" and "Yuan You". His consort is Yu Shiqie.

As Chisongzi

According to certain versions, a certain Chisongzi during the reign of Shennong ended a severe drought by sprinkling water from an earthen bowl and was rewarded by being made the Lord of Rain with a dwelling on the mythical Kunlun Mountain.

In another form, Chi Songzi is depicted as a chrysalis of a silkworm who has a concubine whose face is black, holds a snake in each hand, and has a red snake coming out of one ear and a green snake coming out of the other.

Historical myths
Yu Shi (together with Feng Bo) is said to have aided Chiyou in his struggle against the Yellow Emperor during the Battle of Zhuolu, but was defeated by the intervention of the drought goddess Ba.

Current
Yu Shi is worshiped by Han Chinese, Maonan people, and other people in modern southwest China as an important rain god with ritual prayer ceremonies performed to entreat for rain.

See also
Meng Haoran
Shangyang (rainbird), a mythical one-legged bird
Wong Tai Sin
Yinglong

Notes

References

References
Christie, Anthony (1968). Chinese Mythology. Feltham: Hamlyn Publishing. .
Yang, Lihui, et al. (2005). Handbook of Chinese Mythology. New York: Oxford University Press. 

Chinese gods
Rain deities